Mangazeya was a Northwest Siberian trans-Ural trade colony and later city in the 17th century. Founded in 1600 by Cossacks from Tobolsk, it was situated on the Taz River, between the lower courses of the Ob and Yenisei Rivers flowing into the Arctic Ocean. The name derives from a Nenets ethnonym Monkansi or Mongandi.

Russian settlers of the White Sea coasts of Russia (pomors) founded a route along the Arctic coast to Arkhangelsk to trade with Norwegian, English and Dutch merchants. Mangazeya accumulated furs and ivory (walrus tusks) around the year to be shipped out during the short Northern summer. Trade also occurred along the Siberian River Routes' Northern Route. It became "a virtual Baghdad of Siberia, a city-state, all but independent of the Russian Empire in its wealth and utter isolation."

The Northern Sea Route was forbidden in 1619 under the penalty of death and the city closed to outsiders: navigational markings were torn up, posts established to intercept anyone who might attempt to get through, and maps were falsified. The state was unable to collect taxes, and there was a fear of English trading penetration into Siberia; furthermore, "Mangazeya had aroused the envy of inland merchants working out of the Urals, Tyumen, and Tobolsk, who saw it siphoning off commerce that would otherwise have come their way." The city was finally abandoned following the catastrophic fire of 1678, after which the remaining population was evacuated to Turukhansk  (now ) at the junction of the Yenisei with the Lower Tunguska, which was known as New Mangazeya until the 1780s.

The location of original Mangazeya and the Pomors' Northern Sea Route were forgotten until the 20th century, when archaeologists discovered remains of a wooden Kremlin and a Gostiny Dvor on the site of Mangazeya.

There is a 220 kV electrical substation owned by Gazprom with the same name nearby.

References

External links
Mangazeya: A 16th Century Arctic Trading City in Siberia

Defunct towns in Russia
Geography of Krasnoyarsk Krai
History of Siberia
Pomors
Populated places of Arctic Russia
1600 establishments in Russia
Populated places established in 1600
Archaeological sites in Russia
Taz basin
Cultural heritage monuments in Yamalo-Nenets Autonomous Okrug
Objects of cultural heritage of Russia of federal significance